Relentless is the second studio album by American country music artist Jason Aldean. It was released on May 29, 2007 via Broken Bow Records. The album debuted at number 4 on the U.S. Billboard 200 and at number one on the Top Country Albums chart, selling about 98,000 copies in its first week. On October 4 of the same year, the album was certified gold by the RIAA. It was certified platinum in September 2012.

Relentless has produced three chart singles for Aldean on the Hot Country Songs charts. The lead-off single "Johnny Cash" (originally recorded by Tracy Byrd on his 2004 album Greatest Hits) and "Laughed Until We Cried" both reached No. 6 on that chart, and the title track reached No. 15 in late 2008. Thus, it is Aldean's only album to date to not produce a number one single.

Critical reception
Ken Tucker of Billboard gave a positive review, saying that "every cut features full, guitar-driven production". He considered "Johnny Cash", "Back in This Cigarette" and "I Break Everything I Touch" standout tracks.

Track listing

Chart performance

Weekly charts

Year-end charts

Singles

Certifications

Personnel

Jason Aldean – lead vocals
Kurt Allison – electric guitar
Tony Harrell – piano, Hammond B-3 organ, Wurlitzer
Wes Hightower – background vocals 
Mike Johnson – steel guitar
Tully Kennedy – bass guitar
Steve King – Hammond B-3 organ on "Johnny Cash"
Miranda Lambert – vocals on "Grown Woman"
Liana Manis – background vocals 
Wendell Mobley – background vocals 
Mike Noble – acoustic guitar
Danny Rader – acoustic guitar
Rich Redmond – drums, percussion
Adam Shoenfeld – electric guitar
Jack Sizemore – electric guitar on "Johnny Cash"

References

External links
[ Relentless at allmusic.com]

2007 albums
Jason Aldean albums
BBR Music Group albums
Albums produced by Michael Knox (record producer)